Malte Grashoff (born 2 March 1992) is a German former professional footballer who played as a midfielder.

Career
Grashoff began his career with Werder Bremen, and made his debut for the reserve team in September 2011, as a substitute for Lennart Thy in a 3. Liga match against SpVgg Unterhaching. He signed for Preußen Münster in July 2013.

External links
 
 

1992 births
Living people
Association football midfielders
German footballers
SV Werder Bremen II players
SC Preußen Münster players
VfB Oldenburg players
BSV Schwarz-Weiß Rehden players
3. Liga players
Regionalliga players
People from Stade
Footballers from Lower Saxony